Porotachys is a genus of ground beetles in the family Carabidae. There are about six described species in Porotachys.

Species
These six species belong to the genus Porotachys:
 Porotachys bisulcatus (Nicolai, 1822)  (North America, Europe, Africa, and temperate Asia)
 Porotachys efflatouni (Schatzmayr & Koch, 1934)  (Egypt, Oman, Yemen, and Djibouti)
 Porotachys luxus (Andrewes, 1925)  (Myanmar and Vietnam)
 Porotachys ottomanus Schweiger, 1968  (worldwide)
 Porotachys recurvicollis (Andrewes, 1925)  (Japan)
 Porotachys termiticola (Andrewes, 1936)  (Indonesia)

References

Trechinae